The NCAA Season 81 basketball tournaments are tournaments of the Philippines' National Collegiate Athletic Association for basketball at the 2005–06 season. The tournaments are divided into two divisions: the Juniors tournament for male high school students, and the Seniors tournament for male college students.

Colegio de San Juan de Letran hosted the season, starting with an opening ceremony held at the Araneta Coliseum on June 25, 2005 followed by a double-header. Games in the elimination rounds and semifinals then are subsequently held at the Cuneta Astrodome, with the Finals played at the Araneta. Seniors' games are aired lived by ABS-CBN Sports via Studio 23.

Seniors' tournament

Teams

Elimination round

Team standings

Match-up results

Scores 

Results on top and to the right of the dashes are for first-round games; those to the bottom and to the left of it are second-round games.

Postseason teams

 Letran Knights
The Knights had an amazing streak of eleven straight wins right from opening day. The streak was threatened when they faced fellow unbeaten team, the PCU Dolphins, at the end of the first round. Both sporting 6-0 records, the game went into overtime, and Boyet Bautista and John Paul Alcaraz saved the day for the Knights beat the Dolphins resulting a first round sweep.

The streak ended when the Mapua Cardinals, led by the former All-Canadian Kelvin dela Peña beat the Knights as Letran failed to stop dela Peña and collapsed at the end game.(If Letran won that 2nd round game against Mapua, the Knights could have already scored a 14-0 sweep of the eliminations) The Knights recovered as they blew out the Stags, and swept the regular season series vs. PCU in the season finale.

 PCU Dolphins
The defending champions PCU Dolphins also had their own 6-0 streak, beating Mapua and CSB. But it was ended by Letran (see above) in a tight contest.

Then came the shock loss against the San Beda Red Lions under San Beda's debuting coach Koy Banal. The Dolphins bounced back, beating last year's runner-up UPHSD Altas. However, PCU was defeated by the San Sebastian Stags in their second round rematch. On the next game, they clinched the twice to beat advantage when they beat Mapua. However, they failed to beat Letran in the regular season.

 Mapua Cardinals
The Mapua Cardinals had their best start in fourteen years as they boasted a 4-0 card. But losses against defending champions PCU Dolphins and Intramuros arch rivals Letran dropped their record to 4-2. A buzzer-beater by Neil Pascual off a Kelvin dela Peña pass against the CSB Blazers kept their Final Four hopes alive. But successive loses against underachievering teams Perpetual Altas and JRU Heavy Bombers put the Final Four aspirations in doubt.

After successive wins against the San Beda Red Lions and CSB Blazers, the Cardinals found confidence in their game, and they beat the then undefeated Letran Knights under the heroics of Kelvin dela Peña and Joferson Gonzales. PCU defeated them again in the eliminations, depriving the Cardinals for a twice to beat advantage in the semis. Mapua bounced back and scored a victory against the Stags. (It can be said that if the Cardinals have beaten the Bombers and the Altas, then they would have been seeded as second, armed with a twice-to-beat advantage in the Semifinals and could've been in the Finals.)

 San Sebastian Stags
After failing to enter the Final Four for the first time since its inception in 1998, the Stags are itching to bring back the glory to their school. With 2003 NCAA MVP Leomar Najorda and Redentor Vicente, the Stags look poised to barge back into the Final Four. But with a disappointing 0-3 start, the Stags needed to win against the then undefeated CSB Blazers (3-0). Under the exploits of Najorda and Vicente, the Stags won the game.

The rest of season was a roller-coaster ride, with San Sebastian winning games against weaker teams. But a win against the PCU Dolphins finally sealed their Final Four appearance.

Bracket

Semifinals
Letran and PCU have the twice-to-beat advantage. They only have to win once, while their opponents, twice, to progress.

Letran vs. San Sebastian

The Knights, which had previously routed the Stags in their two elimination round games, dealt their opponents a 32–6 fourth quarter run that blew the game wide open and eliminated San Sebastian from championship contention. The Knights qualified for their second Finals stint in three years.

PCU vs. Mapua

With the game tied 49–all at the start of the fourth quarter, the Dolphins staged a 21–2 with last year's Finals Most Valuable Player (MVP) Rob Sanz scoring key three-pointers to erect a 72–51 advantage at the final two minutes. The defending champions qualified for their second consecutive Finals stint, against Letran, whom they eliminated the previous year in the semifinals in two games.

Finals
Letran and PCU started their two-year rivalry in the 2004 tournament, when the Dolphins eliminated the Knights in the do-or-die semifinal game that went into overtime via former Knight Ronjay Enrile's flubbed freethrows. The Dolphins then beat 2004's first seed UPHDS Altas in two games, taking their first NCAA seniors basketball title.

Finals Most Valuable Player: 

Trailing 65–70 late in Game 1 when Gabby Espinas fouled out, Jayson Castro and Sanz each had a three-pointer in the deciding 11–0 PCU run to put the Dolphins ahead, 76–70 with less than five minutes left. After Jonathan Alvade made a field-goal to cut the lead to three at 74–77, the Dolphins defense prevented another Letran scoring opportunity the rest of the way as they held on to stun the Knights, which had only one loss in the season prior to the game.

In an elimination game for Letran, they scored 25 points in the second quarter to erect a 44–33 lead at halftime. They increased their lead to a commanding 54–33 lead after preventing the Dolphins from scoring in the first five minutes of the third quarter. The Dolphins will cut the lead to fourteen, but that was the nearest they were able to get as the Knights tied the series to force a deciding Game 3.

Letran and PCU were locked in a tight contest at the first quarter, although the Dolphins never led; Letran's Boyet Bautista hit a running three-pointer at the end of the first quarter to prevent the Dolphins from getting close. In the second quarter, Letran twice led by as many as ten points, but the Dolphins limited the Knights to 5 points and a single field-goal to cut Letran's lead. PCU would eventually stare at a 43–41 deficit at the start of the fourth quarter, but Bautista scored on a lay-up that prevent further PCU incursions as the Knights cruised to the victory, and their second championship in three years. Bautista would be named as Finals MVP as he led Letran to their 16th men's basketball title.

Awards
In what was billed as one of the league's closest and most interesting MVP races, former volleyball star Ernie Jay Sagad won MVP honors, defeating last year's MVP and Rookie of the Year Gabby Espinas.
Most Valuable Player:
Mythical Five:

 

 
Rookie of the Year:  
Defensive Player of the Year:  
Most Improved Player of the Year:

NCAA Players of the Week
Starting on the 2005-06 Season, the NCAA Press Corps has awarded the NCAA Player of the Week award to the most outstanding basketball player in a given week.
June 25 – July 3: Kelvin dela Peña, Mapua
July 4–10: Aaron Aban, Letran
July 11–17: Gabby Espinas, PCU
July 18–24: Jonathan Aldave, Letran
July 25–31: J. P. Alcaraz, Letran
Aug 1–7: Jerome Paterno, San Beda
Aug 8–14: Boyet Bautista, Letran
Aug 15–21: Jayson Castro, PCU
Aug 22–28: Leo Najorda, San Sebastian
Aug 29 – Sep 4: Mark Andaya, Letran
Sep 5–11: Robert Sanz, PCU
Sep 19–25: Boyet Bautista, Letran (Finals MVP)

Juniors' tournament

Elimination round

Third-seed playoff

Bracket

Semi-finals

Finals

Finals Most Valuable Player:

Individual awards
Season Most Valuable Player:  
Rookie of the Year: 
Mythical Five:

 

Defensive Player of the Year: 
Most Improved Player of the Year:

See also 
 UAAP Season 68 men's basketball tournament

References

81
2005–06 in Philippine basketball